Umtentweni is a small coastal resort and extension of Port Shepstone between the Mzimkulu River (the great home of all rivers) and the Mtentweni River (named after a species of grass the grows on its banks). It is situated in the Ray Nkonyeni Local Municipality (part of the Ugu District Municipality), KwaZulu-Natal, South Africa. It is a relatively clean and quiet residential resort; it has become an attractive destination for people aiming to get away from city life. Most of the town is filled with complexes, flats, bed and breakfasts and suburban-style houses. Twenty years ago the whole of Umtentweni consisted of a lot of greenery and wildlife. All this has changed due to the growing popularity of this small resort and the constant clearing for new housing.

Umtentweni is lies between the Port Shepstone Central Business District (CBD) which is on the opposite bank of the Mzimkhulu River in the south and Sea Park in the north.

The Port Shepstone Country Club is also located in Umtentweni on the banks of the Mzimkhulu River. There is also a public beach, a whale deck and a tennis club.

References

Populated places in the Ray Nkonyeni Local Municipality
Populated coastal places in South Africa
KwaZulu-Natal South Coast